The eastern sirystes has been split into the following species:

Sibilant sirystes Sirystes sibilator
White-rumped sirystes Sirystes albocinereus
Todd's sirystes Sirystes subcanescens

Birds by common name